Idris Arthur Towill (12 November 1909 – 21 September 1988) was a Welsh rugby union and professional rugby league footballer who played in the 1930s and 1940s.

Background
Idris Towill's birth was registered in Bridgend district, Wales, and he died aged 78.

Early career
A schoolboy international for Wales at rugby union, Towill captained his local rugby union team Bridgend and made four appearances for Glamorgan County before switching codes to rugby league when he signed for Huddersfield in January 1931.

Rugby league career

Huddersfield
Towill played 94 matches for Huddersfield, scoring 20 tries, between 1931 and 1936 including a Challenge Cup final appearance in the 1935 final at Wembley Stadium on 4 May 1935. Towill played at right- and scored Huddersfield's first try in the 8–11 defeat by Castleford.

Keighley
In November 1936 Towill signed for Keighley where he played 271 games, scoring 55 tries, until injury ended his career in 1946.  A second Challenge Cup final appearance was made for Keighley in the 5–18 defeat by Widnes at Wembley in the 1937 final on 8 May 1937.

The end of his career was marked by a joint benefit match with fellow Keighley stalwart, Norman Foster, on 14 May 1946.  Towill's select XIII beat Foster's select XIII 41–40.

References

1909 births
1988 deaths
Bridgend RFC players
Castleford Tigers players
Glamorgan County RFC players
Huddersfield Giants players
Keighley Cougars players
Oldham R.L.F.C. players
Rugby league centres
Rugby league five-eighths
Rugby league players from Bridgend County Borough
Rugby union players from Bridgend County Borough
Wales national rugby league team players
Welsh rugby league players
Welsh rugby union players